Ernst Börngen (7 February 1916 – 30 June 1989) was a Luftwaffe ace and recipient of the Knight's Cross of the Iron Cross during World War II.  The Knight's Cross of the Iron Cross was awarded to recognise extreme battlefield bravery or successful military leadership. Börngen claimed 41 victories in 450 missions.

Career
On 20 May 1942, Börngen officially replaced Hauptmann (captain) Ernst Düllberg as Staffelkapitän (squadron leader) of 5. Staffel. Düllberg had been wounded in action on 22 November 1941 and Börngen had already acted as intermittent Staffelführer for some weeks. On 11 July 1942, Börngen's Messerschmitt Bf 109 F-4 trop (Werknummer 10 203—factory number) was damaged in aerial combat with Curtiss P-40 Warhawk fighters, resulting in a forced landing east of El Dabaa

Börngen led 5. Staffel until 16 July 1943. That day, he had claimed his 28th aerial victory over a Consolidated B-24 Liberator. During the attack, his Bf 109 G-6  (Werknummer 18 371) took a cabin hit from the defensive fire of the bomber, wounding him severely. Despite being wounded, he crash landed the aircraft at San Vito dei Normanni.

In May 1944, the Allies initiated the Oil Campaign of World War II, targeting various facilities supplying Germany with petroleum, oil, and lubrication products. On 12 May, the Eighth Air Force sent an attack force of 886 heavy bombers, protected by 980 escort fighters, against the German refineries in central Germany at Leuna, Merseburg, Böhlen and Zeitz. In defense of this attack, I. Gruppe engaged a formation of Boeing B-17 Flying Fortress bombers shortly past 12:30 just east of Eschborn. In this encounter, the Gruppenkommandeur (group commander) of I. Gruppe, Major Ludwig Franzisket was severely wounded. The next day, Börngen succeeded Franzisket as commander of I. Gruppe and surrendered his command of 2. Staffel to Leutnant Karl Wünsch.

On 19 May 1944, the Eighth Air Force targeted Berlin and Braunschweig with 888 heavy bombers, protected by 964 escort fighters. The German aerial defenses under the command Jagdfliegerführer Ostmark ordered I. Gruppe, led by Börngen and at the time based at Fels am Wagram, to take off at 11:43. Börngen's group was ordered to meet up with III. and VI. Gruppe to form a larger combat formation. This formation was then vectored to Magdeburg where at 13:00 they encountered the escort fighters of a formation of Consolidated B-24 Liberator bombers northwest of the city. While III. and VI. Gruppe engaged the Republic P-47 Thunderbolt and North American P-51 Mustang fighters, the Stabsschwarm and I. Gruppe managed to attack the B-24 bombers. Following the encounter, JG 27 claimed 17 aerial victories, including Herausschüsse (separation shots)—a severely damaged heavy bomber forced to separate from his combat box which was counted as an aerial victory. In return, JG 27 suffered five aircraft lost, two pilots killed in action and one pilot severely wounded. At 13:15, Börngen had shot down a B-24 near Helmstedt and then at 13:20 engaged another bomber by ramming it with his Bf 109 G-6 (Werknummer 441 101—factory number), sustaining severe injuries. He managed to bail out and was immediately taken to the Luftwaffen hospital at Helmstedt where his right arm had to be amputated. Börngen was then replaced by Major Wolfgang Redlich as commander of I. Gruppe.

Summary of career

Aerial victory claims
Börngen was credited with 41 enemy aircraft shot down in over 450 combat missions, the majority of which on the Western Front and two on the Eastern Front. This figure includes 16 four-engined bombers. Mathews and Foreman, authors of Luftwaffe Aces — Biographies and Victory Claims, researched the German Federal Archives and found records for 35 aerial victory claims, plus four further unconfirmed claims. This figure includes two aerial victories on the Eastern Front and 33 over the Western Allies, including 14 four-engined bombers.

Awards
 Front Flying Clasp of the Luftwaffe in Gold (6 May 1941)
 Iron Cross (1939)
 2nd Class
 1st Class
 Wound Badge (1939)
 in Black
 in Silver
 Honour Goblet of the Luftwaffe (Ehrenpokal der Luftwaffe) on 25 January 1943 as Oberleutnant and Staffelkapitän
 German Cross in Gold on 31 August 1943 as Hauptmann in the 5./Jagdgeschwader 27
 Knight's Cross of the Iron Cross on 3 August 1944 as Hauptmann and Staffelkapitän of the 5./Jagdgeschwader 27

Notes

References

Citations

Bibliography

 
 
 
 
 
 
 
 
 
 
 
 
 
 
 

1916 births
1989 deaths
Luftwaffe pilots
German World War II flying aces
Recipients of the Gold German Cross
Recipients of the Knight's Cross of the Iron Cross
People from Altenburger Land
People from Saxe-Altenburg
German amputees
Pilots who performed an aerial ramming
Military personnel from Thuringia